The Mangoplah Football Club is an Australian Rules Football club. It competes in and around the Wagga Wagga area in New South Wales, Australia. The Mangoplah Football Club was founded in 1913 by D J Lloyd, who became the club's first captain. In 1955 the club merged with Cookardinia United FC.

History

Early years 
 1913 - first documented game in August against Cookardinia

 1914 - first official competitive match in the Yerong Creek & District Football Association for the Webster Cup against Cookardinia, Henty, The Rock and Yerong Creek. Mangoplah lost to Cookardinia. Henty won.

 1915 - played for the Webster Cup, where they won the Grand Final Cup by defeating Yerong Creek.

 1916 - play suspended due to World War I.

 1917- Culcairn Patriotic Football Association competition formed, including Mangoplah, Cookardinia, Culcairn, Henty and The Rock. Mongoplah lost to Culcairn.

 1918 - Mangoplah played in the Yerong Creek & District Football Association (YC&DFA) against The Rock and Yerong Creek. 

 1919 - Mangoplah won the grand final of the Wagga United Football Association (WUFA) by defeating Royal Stars.  Alby Anderson played there from 1919 to 1922.

 1920 - Mangoplah lost the WUFA Semi Final to the Wagga Federals. Royal Stars defeated the Federals in the Grand Final.

 1921 - Mangoplah lost the WUFA semifinal to the Royal Stars. Royal Stars once again defeated the Federals in the 1921 Grand Final.

 1922 - Mangoplah competed in the Riverina Main Line Football Association (RMLFA) against Culcairn, Henty, Newtown, The Rock, Wagga Federals, Wagga Stars and Yerong Creek, with the Stars defeating Yerong Creek in the Grand Final. On the eve of the final series Culcairn, Henty, and Mangoplah withdrew from the competition, because the association refused to provide a VFL umpire for the final series.

 1923 - Mangoplah applied to re-enter the WUFA, but the other clubs voted against them. Mangoplah then joined YC&DFA and won the minor premiership but lost their semifinal match to Culcairn. Mangoplah, as the minor premiers, exercised their right to challenge the "final" winners. Mangoplah played Culcairn in the Grand Final at Yerong Creek and won the YC&DFA premiership.

 1924 - Mangoplah re-joined WUFA, finishing 5th on the final ladder, with the Wagga Federals winning the premiership.

 1925 - Mangoplah lost the WUFA Grand Final to The Rock, but as the minor premiers, Mangoplah challenged The Rock to another game, which Mangoplah won.

 1926 - Mangoplah won WUFA premiership when they defeated Tootool in the Grand Final.

 1927 - Mangoplah defeated The Rock in WUFA Grand Final.

 1928 - Mangoplah lost the WUFA Grand Final to The Rock. As the minor premiers, Mangoplah were entitled to challenge The Rock to another game and won.

 1929 - Mangoplah joined The Rock & District Football League (R&DFL) and competed against Cookardinia, Pleasant Hills, The Rock, Uranquinty, and Yerong Creek. Mangoplah defeated Uranquinty to win the premiership.

 1930 - Mangoplah finished second, defeated by Uranquinty in R&DFL semifinal. Tootool defeated Osborne in the Grand Final.

 1931 - Mangoplah won the R&DFL premiership, defeating Cookardinia in the Grand Final.

 1932 - Mangoplah lost the R&DFL Grand Final to the Rock.

 1933 - The R&DFL Grand Final was abandoned at half time, when police intervene late in the second quarter after a series of fights. The umpires declined to continue after half time, with the scores level at 42 – 26. Mangoplah then won The R&DFL Grand Final replay, defeating Lockhart.

 1934 - Mangoplah joined the Wagga Australian Rules Football League (WARFL) and won the premiership, defeating Newtown in the Grand Final. Mangoplah played a match in late September against a combined WARFL side and won 70 to 68. Mangoplah's Billy Lloyd won the WARFL Best and Fairest award - the J C Blamey Blazer. After 12 years as Club Secretary, C. Caldwell left Mangoplah, in January.

 1935 - former The Rock and Collingullie player, Mel Rudd, made his debut for Fitzroy. Mangoplah's Merv Cooper and W. "Billy" Lloyd both made Fitzroy's final list, but never played senior VFL football. Mangoplah went down to North Wagga in the WARFL Grand Final.

 1936 - Mangoplah went undefeated, beating Wagga in the WARFL Grand Final that was played at Bolton Park, Wagga. Mangoplah's full forward, Eddie Smeaton, kicked 39 goals against Currawarna in the second last match. Smeaton ended up kicking 164 goals for the season, including 10 in two finals matches. Mangoplah won the Ganmain Football Carnival premiership. Mangoplah also won the Ariah Park Knockout competition, defeating Barellan 40 to 19 points in the Grand Final.

 1937 - Mangoplah joined the Albury & District Football League (A&DFL) and lost the Grand Final to Henty. Mangoplah's Mervyn Cooper won the A&DFL best and fairest award with 31 votes.

 1938 - Mangoplah appointed former Essendon and Sandringham player, Russell Madden as coach, and he led them to a premiership in the A&DFL, winning the Mackie Pennant. Mangoplah also won the Ariah Park football knockout competition. Mangoplah's Merv Cooper finished third in the A&DFL Best and Fairest award 

 1939 - Mangoplah lost their A&DFL semifinal match to Culcairn. Brocklesby defeated Henty in the A&DFL Grand Final.

 1940 - Mangoplah won the A&BFL premiership, defeating Culcairn in the Grand Final. Mangoplah's captain, Ray Roberson received the A&DFL best and fairest award. Mangoplah also won the Wagga Patriotic Football Knockout competition, defeating Wagga.

 1941 - Mangoplah returned to WARFA and won the premiership, defeating Junee. They celebrated with a Victory Ball at the Mangoplah Hall. Mangoplah's Ray Roberson was runner up in the WARFA Best and Fairest Award.

 1942-1944 - It appears that Mangoplah was in recess due to World War II.

The Post War Years 
 1945 - After three years in recess, Mangoplah joined the Culcairn & District Football Association and won the first of six consecutive premierships defeating Henty. Mangoplah also won the Yerong Creek Football Knockout competition. 

 1946 - Mangoplah won the Yerong Creek Football Knockout competition. Mangoplah re-joined the A&DFL and won the premiership. Club Best and Fairest winner was Ray Roberson. 

 1947 - L. Anderson won the club Best and Fairest award, with Horace Clarke runner Up. Mangoplah won the A&DFL premiership. 

 1948 - Horace Clarke and Alan Klimpsch tied for the club Best and Fairest award. Mangoplah won the A&DFL premiership.

 1949 - the club Best and Fairest winner was Bert Kelly. Mangoplah were runners-up in the Yerong Creek Knockout Carnival. Mangoplah won the A&DFL premiership.

 1950 - the A&DFLLeague introduced a Reserve Grade Competition, and Horace Clark won the club Best and Fairest award. Horace Clark was runner up in the A&DFL Best and Fairest award. Mangoplah won the A&DFL premiership.

 1951 - Mangoplah lost the A&DFL first semifinal to Wagga. Mangoplah hosted the A&DFL Grand Final where Holbrook defeated Culcairn.

 1952 - the A&DFL Reserves competition was divided into two divisions – North (Wagga) and South (Albury). Mangoplah lost their A&DFL first semifinal to Holbrook. Mangoplah hosted the A&DFL Grand Final in which Culcairn defeated Wagga, which ended sensationally. Mangoplah were runners-up in the Yerong Creek Knockout Carnival.

 1953 - Mangoplah finished 7th on the ladder, with three wins and eleven losses for the season, while their second eighteen finished 3rd.

 1954 - Mangoplah appointed former Richmond player, Bernie Waldron as coach, and finished the season in 5th place with five wins, eight losses and one draw, while Cookardinia finished last, with one win and 13 losses. Mangoplah and Cookardinia football clubs merged.. In March, Watty Lloyd retired after completing 21 consecutive years as club secretary. Bill McRae took over as Secretary, and Bill Parker replaced Ray Roberson as president.
 1955 - Mangoplah Cookardinia FC entered the A&DFL
 1985 - Steve Cole and Mark Fraser represented NSW against the ACT.
 1998 - Mangoplah Cookardinia United-Eastlakes Football Club  was formed in 1998 via the merger of the Mangoplah Cookadinia United Football Club and Eastlakes Football Club.

Miscellaneous 
The three football grades and the netball teams compete in the Riverina Football League.

The official mascot is the goanna.

Mangoplah FC Senior Football Timeline & Premierships (1913 to 1954) 
1913 - No competition matches, just a few friendly matches against other local teams.
1914 - Yerong Creek & District Football Association.
1915 - Yerong Creek & District Football Association. Webster Cup (Premiers)
1916 - Mangoplah FC in recess due to World War I
1917 - Culcairn & District Patriotic Football Association
1918 - Yerong Creek & District Football Association
1919 to 1921 - WUFA: 1919
1922 - Riverina Main Line Football Association
1923 - Yerong Creek & District Football Association: 1923
1924 to 1928 - WUFA: 1925, 1926, 1927, 1928
1929 to 1933 -The Rock & District Football League: 1929, 1931,1933
1934 to 1936 - Wagga Australian Rules Football League: 1934, 1936
1936 to 1938 - Ariah Park Knock Out Competition, Ganmain Football Carnival
1937 to 1940 - A&DFL: 1938, 1940
1940 - Wagga Patriotic Football Knockout Competition
1941 - Wagga Australian Rules Football League
1942 to 1944 - Mangoplah FC in recess due to World War II
1945 - Culcairn & District Football Association
1945 to 1946 - Yerong Creek Knockout Football Carnival
1946 to 1954 - A&DFL
1953 - Yerong Creek Knockout Football Carnival

Runners up
1917 - Culcairn & District Patriotic Football Association
1930 - The Rock & District Football League
1932 - The Rock & District Football League
1935 - Wagga Australian Rules Football League
1937 - A&DFL
1947 - Yerong Creek Football Carnival
1952 - Yerong Creek Football Carvival

Senior Football Captain / Coaches
1920 - J Pigdon (captain)
1924 - J Lloyd (captain)
1927–30: Perry Armstrong
1931–34: Paddy Lloyd
1935 - J Lloyd (captain)
1936–37: No information
1938 - Russell Madden
1939 - Ray Roberson (captain)
1940 - Ray Roberson (captain)
1941 - Ray Roberson
1945 - No information
1946–48: Ray Roberson
1949–51: Allan Klimpsch
1952 - Harry Kline
1953 - Allan Klimpsch
1954 - Bernie Waldron

VFL Players
The following footballers played with Mangoplah prior to senior VFL football.
1923 – Tim Archer – St. Kilda
1924 – Alby Anderson – St. Kilda & Richmond
1935 – Mel Rudd – Fitzroy

Mangoplah / Cookardinia United FC Senior Football Premierships & Timeline (1955-1997)
1955-1956 - A&DFL
1957-1981 - Farrer Football League 
1982-1984 - Riverina District Football League
1985-1994 - Farrer Football League – Division One: 1985, 1988, 1989, 1990 & 1993

1995-1997 - Riverina Football League 

Senior Football – Runners Up

Farrer Football League -1958, 1969, 1974, 1978
1982- 1984 - Riverina District Football League: 1982, 1983, 1984
1985 - 1994 - Farrer Football League – Division One: 1986, 1987, 1992, 1993

Senior Football Coaches
1953–55: Allan Klimpsch
1956–59: Bill Byrne
1960: Allan Klimpsch
1961–62: Bill Barton 
1963–65: Frank Slater
1966–70: Arthur Cole
1970–72: No information
1973–75: Graham Ion 
1976: Arch Wilkey
1978: No information
1979: Greg Carroll
1980–81: Mick Daniher
1982: Phil Cohalan
1983–85: Greg Leech
1986–87: Zane Separovich
1988–89: Steven Hedley 
1990: Tony Turner
1991: Scott Barber
1992–94: Phil Cohalan
1995: Shane Gorman
1996: Danny Galvin
1997–98: Merv Neagle

VFL / AFL Players
The following players played with Mangoplah / Cookardinia prior to playing VFL football, with the year indicating their VFL / AFL debut.

1957 – Bill Byrne – Melbourne
1979 – Wayne Carroll – Sydney Swans
1987 – Matthew Lloyd – Sydney Swans
1987 – Michael Phyland – Sydney Swans
1993 – Nathon Irvin – Sydney Swans
1997 – Mark Conway – Port Adelaide

Mangoplah Cookardinia United Eastlakes FNC Senior Premierships & Timeline (1998-2020)
1998- Present Riverina Football League 

Senior – Runners Up
Riverina Football League: 2015, 2015

Senior Football Coaches

1997–98: Merv Neagle 
1999: No information
2000: Bevan Rowe
2001: Owen Geddes
2002–03: Scott Allen
2004–05: Rodney Simms
2006: Barry O'Brien
2007: Tony Balding (npc)
2008: Nick Smith
2009: Wayne de Britt (npc)
2010–11: Chris Willis
2012–14: Nathon Irvin 
2015: Chris Daniher / Trevor Ion (npc)
2016: Nathon Irvin / Travis Cohalan
2017–18: Travis Cohalan (npc)
2019–20: Jeremy Rowe (npc)
(npc): non-playing coach)

AFL Players
The following footballers played with MCUEFC prior to being drafted by an AFL club
2012 – Orren Stephenson – Geelong
2000 – Jock Cornell – Geelong. (2016 AFL Rookie Draft No.9)
2015 – Harrison Himmelberg – Greater Western Sydney

References

External links
Pictures of Mangoplah Station (NSWRail.net)
Mangoplah FC – Premiership Medals
1925 – Wagga United FA Premiers: Mangoplah FC team photo
1929 – The Rock & District FA Premiers: Mangoplah FC team photo
1939 – Team photos of both Mangoplah & The Rock Football Clubs
1940 – A&DFL Premiers: Mangoplah FC team photo
1945 – Mangoplah & Wodonga FC team photos
1948 - Albury & District FL Premiers - Mangoplah FC & The Rock FC team photos
1949 - Albury & District FL Premiers - Mangoplah FC & Wagga FC team photos
1950 – A&DFL Premiers: Mangoplah FC team photo
A&DFL Premierships & Best & Fairest Lists. 1930 to 1956
Mangoplah FC – Club History
Mangoplah Cookardinia United Eastlakes Football & Netball Club
AFL – Riverina. “A blast from the past”, which includes profiles of – Wayne Carroll, Phillip Cohanlon, Arthur Cole, Stephen Cole, Mick Daniher, George Galvin, Graham Ion, Matthew Lloyd & John Ross

Australian rules football clubs in New South Wales